Nashid Kamal (born 19 March 1958) is a Bangladeshi vocalist, writer and professor of demography. She is the eldest granddaughter of Bengali folk singer Abbasuddin Ahmed. Kamal is widely regarded as a Nazrul exponent. For her contributions to Nazrul's works, she has received awards including the Nazrul Award from the Nazrul Academy in 2009 and Nazrul Padak from the Nazrul Institute in 2014.

Background 
Kamal, the eldest of three children, was born in London, England to parents Mustafa Kamal and Husne Ara Kamal. Her father was a judge and served as the Chief Justice of Bangladesh. Her mother was a poet, philanthropist and professor. She was the Chairman of the Department of Social Welfare at Dhaka University before she took her retirement. She has two sisters, Naeela Sattar and Nazeefa K. Monem. Her uncle, Mustafa Zaman Abbasi, is a Bangladeshi musicologist and aunt, Ferdausi Rahman, is a legendary singer . At the age of two, Nashid Kamal moved with her parents to Bangladesh (erstwhile East Pakistan), her mother country, to live permanently.

Kamal started singing at a young age. On 25 December 1964, she appeared on Pakistan Television (PTV), East Pakistan Centre, which is now Bangladesh Television (BTV) as a child singer on its inauguration day. Apart from studying, she started learning music from various notable gurus including Ustad P.C. Gomes, Ustad Akther Shadmani, Ustad Quader Zameeree and Pandit Jasraj Besides learning music and singing, she became a debater and television presenter. Kamal was awarded with the Best Speaker prize in 1976, when she participated in the first ever TV Debate Competition in Bangladesh called Torko Jukti Torko.

Nashid Kamal married Dr. Anis Waiz in 1993, who served the Bangladesh Army and retired as a Major General. He died in 2002. She has two daughters, Armeen Musa and Aashna Musa from her first husband Hossain Md. Musa. Armeen, a singer-song writer by herself, conducts the choir Ghaasphoring. Aashna is a lawyer/civil servant and resides in U.K.Nashid Kamal lives in Dhaka.Bangladesh.

Education 
Kamal attended the Holy Cross Girls' High School, and stood 7th in the merit list for girls in the Secondary School Certificate (SSC) examination in 1973. In 1975, she sat for Higher Secondary Examination (HSC) from the Holy Cross College, and stood 2nd in the combined merit list. She studied statistics for her BSc( Hons) degree at the University of Dhaka, and passed with a first-class-first in 1980 (record marks). Subsequently, Kamal went on to Carleton University, Ottawa, Ontario in Canada to do her MSc in mathematics, and achieved the degree in 1982. Kamal attended the London School of Hygiene & Tropical Medicine (LSHTM) at Camden for a doctoral degree in Medical Demography, and was awarded with the PhD in 1996.

Career

Researcher 
Nashid Kamal's professional career as a researcher started in 1983, when she joined ICDDR.B. She worked there for three years. She had, also, been a consultant to UNFPA in Bangladesh(1999) and Sudan(2001). She has more than 25 publications in peer reviewed journals including the widely acknowledged health journal – The Lancet. Her areas of interest are fertility decline in developing countries, multilevel regression, contraceptive use, shift in garment works due to MFA, RTI of women in the urban slums in Bangladesh, HIV/ AIDS, association of education of women with their uptake of health benefits.

Academic 
Kamal joined the Institute of Statistical Research and Training (ISRT) at Dhaka University in 1986. Later, she joined Independent University, Bangladesh (IUB) as the head of department of population-environment in 1996 and worked there until 2010, when she joined North South University as a professor of biostatistics. and BRAC Business School as adjunct professor until 2014. She is currently working as an adjunct professor at the IEDCR, Ministry of Health and Family Welfare, Government of Bangladesh. Nashid Kamal has been a visiting scholar in the Department of Anthropology, Penn State University(1999), Department of Sociology, Southern Illinois University (2001) and Department of Statistical Sciences, University College London (2008).

Writer 
Nashid Kamal has sixteen published books, 13 as a writer and three others as an editor. She writes both in Bengali and English. She has written fictions (novels and short stories), poems, autobiographies, articles and essays. She, also, has translated notable Bengali literary works in English mostly from Nazrul. The Return of Laili is her most talked about book series, which is a translation of Nazrul's popular songs. Chokrobak is another noteworthy translation that comprises twenty two romantic poems of Nazrul. Her other translations include Biography of Kazi Nazrul Islam, a biographical on Bangladesh's National Poet originally written by Rafiqul Islam, and My Life in Melody, an autobiography of Abbas Uddin Ahmed. Jui Phuler Verandah and Rideau Nodir Dharey are Kamal's famed autobiographies that feature her life events in home and abroad. The Glass Bangles, written in English, is a novel about a Bangladeshi Sylheti girl married to someone living in London. Ajibon Bosonto is one of her favourite books that is a collection of fourteen short stories. Chiro Unnoto Momo Sheer and Ei Achi Ei Nai are two books of collected articles edited by Kamal that feature her parents, Justice Mustafa Kamal and Professor Husne Ara Kamal, respectively. The Garden of Errors is another collection of articles written by Kamal herself, and includes selected writings published in popular daily and weekly newspapers and magazines like the People, Holiday, Daily Star and Probe since 1972.Her latest book is published by Journeyman in 2021. It is titled `Chasing Dreams' an autobiography of Md. Hafizur Rahman edited by Nashid Kamal (maternal grandfather).

Vocalist 
Nashid Kamal is singing for over four decades. She is widely known for her reputation as a fine singer of Nazrul Shongeet and Bengali Folk songs. She is also a classical and semi-classical music artist. Besides, she also sings Urdu Ghazals. Apart from singing in Bengali and Urdu, she has sung in many other foreign languages including Japanese, Chinese, Rumanian and Turkish. Kamal has eleven recorded musical albums to her credit, composed of Nazrul Geeti, Ghazals and Folk songs. She has been a regular performer in various Radio and Television stations in Bangladesh and India since she started singing as a child artist. She has performed in many stage shows in India, Bangladesh, Pakistan, Japan, Turkey, Romania, USA, UK and Canada. In 1989, as  Bangladeshi delegate she performed in the inaugural session of Salt Lake Stadium, Kolkata, India sharing the stage with Manna De, Sandhya Mukhopadhay, Lata Mungeshkar, among others. In 2009 she went as a Bangladeshi delegate to sing in the folk festival in Uzbekistan.She has performed in the `Bongomela' in USA 2013, 2018 and Nazrul Shommelon in USA 2018.

Awards 
 1969 Best student of the school Award from Little jewels School,dhaka, Bangladesh.
 1976 Torko Jukti Torko Best Speaker Award, BTV 
 1989 Nattosabha best singer award 1989, Bangladesh
 2011 ATN Bangla Life time achievement Award
 2016 Wings Award for leadership, Dhaka, Bangladesh
 2014 Inner Wheel Award for leadership, Dhaka
 2017 Channel I Music Award, Nazrul songs (Critic Award), Bangladesh
 2017 Michael Madhusudan Dutta Award, Kolkata, India (for Nazrul translation)
 2009: Nazrul Award by Nazrul Academy, Bangladesh
 2014: Nazrul Padak by Nazrul Institute, Bangladesh
 2014: Nazrul Padak given by Churulia Nazrul Academy, India
 2011: City Cell Channel I Music Award by Critic award, Bangladesh
 2017 Channel I Music Award in Nazrul songs, Bangladesh
 2017 Mosharraf Hossain Literary Award, Bangladesh
 2017 Michael Madhusudan award for translations of Nazrul, Kolkata, India
 2018 Jodhpur Park festival Anannya Award, Kolkata, India
 2018 Michael Madhusudan music award, Kolkata, India. 
 2018 Choyon Literary Award, gold medal, Dhaka, Bangladesh
 2019 Uttara Rotary Club Lifetime Award
 2019 Sharthok Telefilm Lifetime Award
 2021 SAARC Women's award

Grants and scholarships 
 Research Assistantship, Dept of Mathematics and Statistics, Carleton University, Ottawa, Canada. 1981–1982
 Short Course Grant, East West University, USA. 1990
 Overseas Student's Grant, LSHTM, UK. 1992–1996
 Simon Population Fellowship, UK. 1994
 Mellon Foundation Award, USA. Summer 2001
 AIBS Award, USA. Summer 2001
 CAS Award, ICSB Biostatisticians 2008
 IUSSP Grant, Morocco. 2009
 Visiting scholar in: Penn State University (1999), Southern Illinois University(2001), University College London (2008)

Works

Bibliography

Fiction 
 Ajibon Bosonto (Spring Forever). Short stories. Dhaka, Bangladesh: Annoy Publishers. 2005
 Glass Bangles. Novel. Dhaka, Bangladesh: Adorn Publications. 2011

Autobiography 
 Jui Phuler Verandah (Balcony of Jui). Dhaka, Bangladesh: Annanya Publications. 2002
 Rideau Nodir Dharey (By the River Rideau). Dhaka, Bangladesh: Annanya Publications. 2009

Essay 
 The Garden of Errors. Dhaka, Bangladesh: Adorn Publications. 2014
Life's lyrics, India, Bihaan Publishers 2019.

Translations 
 The Return of Laili. Translation of Nazrul's songs. Dhaka, Bangladesh: Adorn Publications. 2010
 Biography of Kazi Nazrul Islam. Nazrul's biography. Rafiqul Islam. Dhaka, Bangladesh: Nazrul Institute. 2013
 My Life in Melodies. Abbas Uddin's autobiography. Abbasuddin Ahmed. Dhaka, Bangladesh: Adorn Publications. 2014
 Chokrobak (The Swan). Translation of Nazrul Islam's book. Dhaka, Bangladesh: Nazrul Institute. 2014
 The Return of Laili 2. Translation of Nazrul Islam's songs. Dhaka, Bangladesh: Adorn Publications. 2016
 `The path of the comet and other essays' Translation of the editorials of Nazrul Islam published in his magazine Dhumketu. Nazrul Institute 2018 
 `Yearning Eyes' Translation of the book Chokher Chatok (lyrics) by Kazi Nazrul Islam, Anannya Publishers, 2019

Edited 
 Ei Achi Ei Nai (Temporary existence). Collection of articles. Dhaka, Bangladesh: Probe Publications. 2013
 Chiro Unnoto Momo Shir (Head high at all time). Collection of articles. Dhaka, Bangladesh: Osgood Publications. 2014
 `Chasing Dreams' Autobiography of Md. Hafizur Rahman. Journeyman, 2021

Discography

References

External links 
 The Return of Laili at Amazon
 The Glass Bangles at Amazon
Life's Lyrics at Amazon
 Kamal on Nazrul and Abbas Uddin with VOA Bangla

Bangladeshi women writers
20th-century Bangladeshi women singers
20th-century Bangladeshi singers
Living people
University of Dhaka alumni
Academic staff of the University of Dhaka
Alumni of the London School of Hygiene & Tropical Medicine
Carleton University alumni
Holy Cross College, Dhaka alumni
Bangladeshi Nazrul Geeti singers
1958 births
21st-century Bangladeshi women singers
21st-century Bangladeshi singers